"Teenage Icon" is a song from English indie rock band the Vaccines. The track was released in the United Kingdom on 2 September 2012 as the second single from the band's second studio album, Come of Age (2012). The track was unveiled by the band on 19 July, and has since been introduced to the band's live setlist. A four-track extended play was made available in August, including the B-side "Panic Attack".

Rolling Stone named the song the 14th best song of 2012.

Track listing

Live performances
The band performed "Teenage Icon" for BBC Radio 1's Live Lounge on 3 September 2012, also performing a cover of American artist Taylor Swift's "We Are Never Ever Getting Back Together".

Charts

Release history

References

2012 singles
The Vaccines songs
2012 songs
Columbia Records singles